Talupula is a village in Sri Sathya Sai district of the Indian state of Andhra Pradesh. It is the headquarters of Talupula mandal in Kadiri revenue division.

Geography 
It has an average elevation of 382 metres (1256 ft).

Demography 
The mandal of Talupula has a surface area of 280.3 km2 (69,234 acres) and a population of 42,019 (2001 census). Dalits constitute 10% of the population, and tribes 6%. The gender ratio is 959. The literacy rate of the mandal is 51%. Among them, males make up 67%, while females make up 35%. The working class consists of 45% agricultural labour, 1% industrial workers, and unorganised workers at 16%. School children are 6159 (661 for every 1 lakh of population), and the teacher-student ratio is 1:23. Junior college students number at 278. For every 1 lakh of population, there only 4 doctors to look after the health of the people. There are 10 beds for every 10,000 people in the government general dispensary.

References 

Villages in Sri Sathya Sai district
Mandal headquarters in Sri Sathya Sai district